Plant breeders' rights (PBR), also known as plant variety rights (PVR), are rights granted to the breeder of a new variety of plant that give the breeder exclusive control over the propagating material (including seed, cuttings, divisions, tissue culture) and harvested material (cut flowers, fruit, foliage) of a new variety for a number of years.

With these rights, the breeder can choose to become the exclusive marketer of the variety, or to license the variety to others. In order to qualify for these exclusive rights, a variety must be new, distinct, uniform, and stable. A variety is:
new if it has not been commercialized for more than one year in the country of protection;
distinct if it differs from all other known varieties by one or more important botanical characteristics, such as height, maturity, color, etc.;
uniform if the plant characteristics are consistent from plant to plant within the variety;
stable if the plant characteristics are genetically fixed and therefore remain the same from generation to generation, or after a cycle of reproduction in the case of hybrid varieties.

The breeder must also give the variety an acceptable "denomination", which becomes its generic name and must be used by anyone who markets the variety.

Typically, plant variety rights are granted by national offices after examination. Seed is submitted to the plant variety office, who grow it for one or more seasons, to check that it is distinct, stable, and uniform. If these tests are passed, exclusive rights are granted for a specified period (typically 20/25 years, or 25/30 years for trees and vines). Annual renewal fees are required to maintain the rights.

Breeders can bring suit to enforce their rights and can recover damages for infringement. Plant breeders' rights contain exemptions from infringement that are not recognized under patent law. Commonly, there is an exemption for farm-saved seed. Farmers may store this production in their own bins for their own use as seed, but this does not necessarily extend to brown-bag sales of seed. Further sales for propagation purposes are not allowed without the written approval of the breeder. There is also a breeders' exemption (research exemption in the 1991 Act) that allows breeders to use protected varieties as sources of initial variation to create new varieties of plants (1978 Act), or for other experimental purposes (1991 Act). There is also a provision for compulsory licensing to assure public access to protected varieties if the national interest requires it and the breeder is unable to meet the demand.

There is tension over the relationship between patent rights and plant breeder's rights. There has been litigation in Australia, the United States, and Canada over the overlap between such rights. Each of these cases was decided on the principle that patents and plant breeders' rights were overlapping and not mutually exclusive. Thus, the exemptions from infringement of plant breeders' rights, such as the saved seed exemption, do not create corresponding exemptions from infringement of the patents covering the same plants. Likewise, acts that infringe the plant breeders' rights, such as exportation of the variety, would not necessarily infringe a patent on the variety, which only allows the patent owner to prohibit making, using, or selling (first sale, but not resale) the patented invention.

International rights

In 1957, in France negotiations took place concerned with the protection of new varieties. This led to the creation of the Union Internationale pour la Protection des Obtentions Végétales (UPOV) and adoption of the first text of the International Convention for the Protection of New Varieties of Plants (UPOV Convention) in 1961. The purpose of the Convention was to ensure that the member states party to the Convention acknowledge the achievements of breeders of new plant varieties by making available to them an exclusive property right, on the basis of a set of uniform and clearly defined principles.

The Convention was revised in Geneva in 1972, 1978 and 1991. Both the 1978 and the 1991 Acts set out a minimum scope of protection and offer member States the possibility of taking national circumstances into account in their legislation. Under the 1978 Act, the minimum scope of the plant breeder's right requires that the holder's prior authorisation is necessary for the production for purposes of commercial marketing, the offering for sale and the marketing of propagating material of the protected variety. The 1991 Act contains more detailed provisions defining the acts concerning propagating material in relation to which the holder's authorisation is required. The breeder's authorisation is also required in relation to any of the specified acts done with harvested material of the variety, unless the breeder has had reasonable opportunity to exercise their right in relation to the propagating material, or if not doing so could constitute an "Omega Threat" situation. Under that provision, for example, a flower breeder who protects their variety in the Netherlands could block importation of cut flowers of that variety into the Netherlands from Egypt, which does not grant plant breeders' rights, because the breeder had no opportunity to exercise any rights in Egypt. Member countries also have the option to require the breeder's authorization with respect to the specified acts as applied to products directly obtained from the harvested material (such as flour or oil from grain, or juice from fruit), unless the breeder has had reasonable opportunity to exercise their right in relation to the harvested material.

The UPOV Convention also establishes a multilateral system of national treatment, under which citizens of any member state are treated as citizens of all member states for the purpose of obtaining plant breeders rights.  It also sets up a multilateral priority filing system, under which an application for protection filed in one member state establishes a filing date for applications filed in all other member states within one year of that original filing date.  This allows a breeder to file in any one member country within the one-year period required to preserve the novelty of their variety, and the novelty of the variety will still be recognized when the filing is done in other member countries within one year of the original filing date. However, if the applicant does not wish to make use of priority filing, he or she has four years in which to apply in all other member states, excepting the United States, for all species except tree and vine species in which case he or she has six years to make application. More information can be obtained in Article 10 (1) (b) of Council Regulation (EC) No. 2100/94 of 27 July 2004. The trigger to start the four- or six-year period is not actually the date on which the first filing is made but the date on which the variety was first commercialised.

The UPOV Convention is not self-executing.  Each member state must adopt legislation consistent with the requirements of the convention and submit that legislation to the UPOV Secretariat for review and approval by the UPOV Council, which consists of all the UPOV member states acting in committee.  In compliance with these treaty obligations, the United Kingdom enacted the Plant Variety and Seeds Act 1964. Similar legislation was passed in the Netherlands, Denmark, Germany, and New Zealand. In 1970 the United States followed the lead of seventeen Western European nations and passed the Plant Variety Protection Act 1970 (US). This legislation provided protection to developers of novel, sexually reproduced plants.  However, the United States originally acceded to the UPOV Convention on the basis of the Plant Patent Act and did not bring the PVP Act into compliance with UPOV requirements until 1984 when the Commissioner of Plant Variety Protection promulgated rules to do so.  Since the 1980s, the US Patent Office has granted patents on plants, including plant varieties this provides a second way of protecting plant varieties in the United States.  Australia passed the Plant Variety Protection Act 1987 (Cth) and the Plant Breeders Rights Act 1994 (Cth). Australian patent law also permits the patenting of plant varieties.  In total, 65 countries have signed the UPOV Convention and adopted plant breeders' rights legislation consistent with the requirements of the convention.

The WTO's Agreement on Trade-Related Aspects of Intellectual Property Rights (TRIPs) requires member states to provide protection for plant varieties either by patents or by an effective sui generis (stand alone) system, or a combination of the two.  Most countries meet this requirement through UPOV Convention-compliant legislation.  India has adopted a plant breeders' rights law that has been rejected by the UPOV Council as not meeting the requirements of the treaty.

The most recent 1991 UPOV convention established several restrictions upon international plant breeders' rights. While the current legislature of the convention recognizes novel varieties of plants as intellectual property, laws were formed concerning the preservation of seeds for future plantation, such that the need to buy seeds to use in subsequent planting seasons would be significantly reduced, and even potentially eliminated altogether. In addition, the 1991 convention also concerns the method of instigating plant breeding by implementing pre-existing and patented plant species as contributor of vital genetic information in the creation of what would legally be regarded as a new variety of plant.

Constituent countries of the World Trade Organization are required to acknowledge the creation of new varieties of plants, and to uphold these creations within full recognition of intellectual property rights laws. A formalized legislature, exemplifying the manner in which such intellectual property rights can be conferred, is demonstrated by the 1991 UPOV convention, which declares such rights upon an individual breeder. This document further identifies a breeder as one who has found or created a plant variety, one who possesses legal authority for the contractual production of a new plant variety, or one who has inherited legal rights to this form of  intellectual property as it was derived under either of the two aforementioned conditions.

As a result of debate over the protection of hybrid plants as new varieties, the legal measure of double protection, as expressed within the current iteration of the UPOV, can be taken. Double protection mediates the overlap between plant breeders' rights and patents that exists within the purview of intellectual property rights law, by enabling the protections of both to be conferred upon a particular plant variety.

Plant breeders' rights (sometimes referred to as breeders' privilege) are contentious, in particular when analysed in balance with other relevant international legal instruments, such as the Convention on Biological Diversity (and its Nagoya Protocol) or the International Treaty on Plant Genetic Resources for Food and Agriculture (Plant Treaty). The UPOV is often criticized on this basis.

Plants as intellectual property 
There have been contrary opinions expressed by both lawyers and scientists assessing the general necessity for the protection of bred plant varieties as a form of intellectual property. Currently, intellectual property rights protect ideas that can be demonstrated as being novel and undiscovered at the time of its legal claim as intellectual property. This definition of novelty, however, has been flexible throughout the history of intellectual property law, both internationally, and within the United States. Expectations of future changes to the legal protection of plant-related forms of intellectual property differ from the legal requirements for the first plant patent. Proponents of these laws recognize an overarching need for the financial support of research and development. Agricultural research and development, for example, has been specified as a particularly demanding endeavor, with respect to immediate concerns for the ability to sustainably feed an increasing global population. On the contrary, some believe that a more diverse approach than the imposition of intellectual property rights laws upon new plant varieties is required. This counter argument asserts that complex social, cultural, and economic factors affect the nature of intellectual property and its protection. A specific concern within this argument is with the means by which seeds are accessed within different local and international regions. Recognizing that this process is extremely transient in nature and can vary greatly over time, supporters of this argument purport that this diversity must be reflected within intellectual property rights laws in order for them to exist as an effective protection of plant breeders' rights.

As a result of this conflict concerning authority over seeds, new legislation has been implemented in the United States. The Open Source Seed Initiative (OSSI) is a national attempt that has been introduced within the United States, and is the first of its kind to model its approach regarding plant breeders' rights upon the mechanisms implemented by openly sourced software mechanisms. Subsequent discourse on this approach has arisen, as concerns with the use of open source technology within a legal framework have developed. Some perceive OSSI as having significantly limited plant breeders' ability to access intellectual property rights for new plant varieties. This has resulted in claims that funding for research and development in this sector will also decline.

Seed sovereignty 

Seed sovereignty can be defined as the right “to breed and exchange diverse open-sourced seeds.” Generally, it comes from the belief that communities should have control over their own seed stock, as a means to increase agricultural biodiversity, resilience, and food security. This idea is closely connected to issues of intellectual property rights, particularly related to the patenting of plant genetics, due to the importance of seed saving in seed sovereignty. Activists argue that farmers and individuals should have legal protection for the practice for maintaining traditional plant varieties. Seed sovereignty activists also argue that seed saving should be protected on the grounds of environmentalism and food security. Some activists argue that seed sovereignty is important because of the cultural value of certain seeds and plant varieties, especially among indigenous communities. Seed sovereignty has strong ties to the food justice and food sovereignty movements, due to its focus on increasing food security for all communities.

See also 
 Plant breeding
 Plant genetic resources
 Biodiversity
 Biopiracy / Bioprospecting
 Germplasm
 Seedbank
 Access and Benefit Sharing Agreement
 Farmers' rights / Peasants' rights
 Convention on Biological Diversity and Nagoya Protocol to the Convention on Biological Diversity
 UPOV Convention on New Varieties of Plants
 United Nations Declaration on the Rights of Peasants
 International Treaty on Plant Genetic Resources for Food and Agriculture (Plant Treaty)
 World Intellectual Property Organization
 Genetic resources (disambiguation)
 Community Plant Variety Office (CPVO)
 National laws (Plant Patent Act of 1930, Plant Variety Protection Act - USA; Protection of Plant Varieties and Farmers' Rights Act, 2001 - India)

References

External links
 "Plants, Patents, and Seed Innovation in the Agricultural Industry", United States Congressional Research Service, September 13, 2002
 "CIOPORA" International community of breeders of asexually reproduced ornamental and fruit varieties
 "Plant Breeder's Rights, Room for Maneuver?" An Opinion Piece from International Journal of Technology and Development Studies by Steve Hughes and Eric Deibel
  Guidance on Plant Breeders' Rights from United Kingdom government website

Biological patent law
Plant reproduction
Plant breeding
Commercialization of traditional medicines
Bioethics
Botany
Plant genetics
Biodiversity
Food security
Plant conservation
Seeds
Sustainable agriculture